Kewa is an Engan language complex of the Southern Highlands province of Papua New Guinea.

Kewa pandanus register
Kewa's elaborate pandanus avoidance register, which is used only in the forest during the karuka harvest, has been extensively documented. The grammar is regularized and the vocabulary is restricted, with about a thousand words that differ from normal language. This was first described by Karl J. Franklin in 1972.

Pandanus-register words have a broader semantic scope. For example, yoyo, a reduplication of yo 'leaf', refers to hair, ear, breast, and scrotum, all things which hang from the body as pandanus leaves hang from the tree. Palaa, 'limb,' (either thigh or branch) is used for any reference to trees, including root, firewood, and fire. (Even in normal Kewa, repena means both 'tree' and 'fire'.) Maeye or 'crazy' refers to any non-human animal except dogs. It contrasts with the rational world of humans.

Many words are coined from Kewa morphology but have idiosyncratic meanings in the forest. Aayagopa, from aa 'man', yago 'fellow', and pa 'to do, to make', refers to man, knee, skin, and neck. Many idiosyncratic phrases are then built on this word. For example, ni madi aayagopa-si (I carry man-) means "my father".

The grammar has also been simplified. Clause-linking morphology is lost and replaced by simple juxtaposition of the clauses. In standard Kewa, there are two sets of verbal endings, one indicating actions done for the speaker's benefit. That set is missing from the pandanus language. The other inflection differs somewhat. For example, the forms of 'to be' are:

(The -nu in aayagopanu is a collective suffix.)

Notes

References

External links 
 Materials on East Kewa are included in the open access Arthur Capell collections (AC1 and AC2) held by Paradisec.
 Kewa – English Dictionary

Engan languages
Languages of Southern Highlands Province
Taboo
Pandanus avoidance registers